Evgeny Igorevich Tarelkin (born December 29, 1974) is a Russian cosmonaut. He was selected as part of the TsPK-13 group in 2003.

Education
Tarelkin graduated from the Yeysk Air Force School in 1996 and the Gagarin Air Force Academy in 1998 before rising to the rank of Captain in the Russian Air Force.

Cosmonaut career
He served in the Air Force until his selection as a cosmonaut as part of the TsPK-13 selection group in 2003, completing basic training in 2005. Tarelkin made his first flight into space in October 2012 as a member of the Soyuz TMA-06M crew, during which he spent six months aboard the International Space Station as part of the Expedition 33/34 crews and returned on March 16, 2013. This was his only spaceflight.

In 2019 he is crew commander in the SIRIUS-19 ground based experiment.

References

1974 births
Russian cosmonauts
Living people
Russian Air Force officers
Heroes of the Russian Federation